Sainik School Gothra, is located in village of Gothra Tappa Khori of Rewari District of Haryana state, is one of 33 Sainik Schools in India. The Principal is Col. Soumyabrata Dhar,  the Vice-Principal is Wg Cdr Kamal Singh Rawat & Adm Officer is Major Avinash kumar. 

School is located at Gothara Tappa Khori on NH-11 Rewari-Narnaul highway.

History 

On 29th Aug 2008, Defence Minister of India, AK Antony, had inaugurated the school.

In Feb 2020, phase-I construction of the school was complete and Chief Minister of Haryana, Manohar Lal Khattar, approved INR 20.83 crore for the construction of phase-II which includes the internal roads, parking, rainwater harvesting system, boundary wall, street lights and security lights.

In Feb 2021, it as informed the pending minor construction work will be completed by 31 March 2021. Academic block was constructed at the cost of INR13.50 cr, mess block with INR 3 cr, hostel for 570 students with INR 9.15 cr, 12 feet high boundary wall with INR 4 cr, were complete. INR 19 cr tender for construction for roads and parking and other pending was issued on 3 March 2021.

School information

Academics

The education in the school follows CBSE pattern.

Learning outcome 

Joining NDA is an ambition for most of the students. In Sept 2018, 40 cadets of Sainik School Rewari had passed the NDA written exam and proceeded to SSB Interview phase.

NDA selection is done in two stages: a single competitive examination for all three forces, followed by an interview conducted by the Services Selection Board. An entrance examination is conducted to select students.

Other sainik schools in Haryana

 Sainik School, Kunjpura, first in haryana and among first five sainik schools in india was established in 1961.
 Sainik School, Matanhail at Matanhail in Jhajjar district was announced by the Haryana govt in 2018. Foundation stone was laid in 2003 by the then Defence Minister George Fernandez, but no progress was made. In 2018, with the efforts of Haryana Finance Minister, Captain Abhimanyu, the BJP govt of Haryana agreed to provide funds and 100 acre land in Matanhail and Rudiyawas villages for the establishment of this school. With this Haryana will be only state in India with 3 sainik schools.

See also
 Indian Naval Academy
 List of boarding schools in India
 List of institutions of higher education in Haryana
 Rashtriya Indian Military College
 Sainik schools

References

External links

 Official website
 Sainik Schools Society

Military education and training in India
Sainik schools
Military high schools
Central Board of Secondary Education
Military schools in India
Rewari
Schools in Haryana